Peter Queally is an Irish former hurler and Gaelic footballer who played for Waterford Championship club Newtown-Ballydurn and Cork Championship club Sarsfields. He played for the Waterford senior hurling team for 14 years, during which time he usually lined out at midfield.

Playing career

Club
Queally plays his club hurling with his local club Newtown-Ballydurn GAA in Waterford. The club presently participates at Junior level.  Due to his profession as a Garda, Queally was stationed in Cork City for a number of years.  Because of this, Queally also had a stint playing for Sarsfields GAA of Glanmire in the Cork Senior Hurling Championship in the late 1990s. He now manages Passage East Hurling Club and led them to their first Senior County Final but losing the Munster Semi-Final to Na Piarsigh by 2 points in The Gaelic Grounds

Inter-county
Queally had a long playing career with the Waterford Senior Hurling Team from the early 1990s up to 2003.  During his playing career, Queally played in several Munster Senior Hurling Finals, winning the Munster Championship in 2002.  Queally retired from inter-county hurling in 2003.  In 2008 Queally returned to the inter-county setup in the role of selector, alongside Davy Fitzgerald and Maurice Geary.  With Queally on board, Waterford managed to reach their first All-Ireland Senior Hurling Championship Final since 1963. Waterford lost to Kilkenny in the final. Peter also played inter-county with Waterford Football and won an All-Ireland Junior Football Medal.

Managerial career
Queally joined Davy Fitzgerald's backroom team at the beginning of Fitzgerald's second spell as Waterford senior hurling team manager, having previously been Roanmore manager until then.

Honours

As a player

Newtown-Ballydurn
Waterford Intermediate Football Championship (1): 1993
Waterford Junior Hurling Championship (1): 1990

Waterford
Munster Senior Hurling Championship (1): 2002
All-Ireland Junior Football Championship (1): 1999
Munster Junior Football Championship (1): 1999

Munster
Railway Cup (2): 2000, 2001

As a manager

Passage
Waterford Senior Hurling Championship (1): 2013

References

Date of birth missing (living people)
Year of birth missing (living people)
Living people
Dual players
Sarsfields (Cork) hurlers
Newtown-Ballydurn hurlers
Waterford inter-county hurlers
Waterford inter-county Gaelic footballers
Munster hurlers
Hurling managers
Hurling selectors